Braunstone is a locality south of Grafton on the Orara Way in northern New South Wales, Australia. The North Coast railway passes through, and a now-closed railway station was provided from 1915.

During the 1850s, Braunstone was the site of a Native Police barracks from which numerous punitive raids upon local Aboriginal groups were conducted. The barracks were located at Police Flat near the Orara River. Officers such as Edric Norfolk Vaux Morisset and John O'Connell Bligh were stationed at the Braunstone barracks.

References

Towns in New South Wales
Grafton, New South Wales
North Coast railway line, New South Wales